Israel Acrelius (December 4, 1714 – April 25, 1800) was a noted Swedish Lutheran missionary and priest.

Early life and education
He was born in Österåker,  Stockholm County, Sweden, in 1714 to Johan and Sara Acrelius ( Gahm). His brother was the surgeon Olof af Acrel. He attended Uppsala University and was ordained as a priest of the Church of Sweden in 1743.  He served as the pastor of churches in Riala, Sweden starting in 1745.

Ministry
Beginning in 1749, Acrelius took a post in Wilmington, Delaware, site of a Swedish Lutheran congregation which dated to the time of the New Sweden colony. At that time, Holy Trinity remained a Swedish Lutheran parish. The church would remain so until placed under the jurisdiction of the Protestant Episcopal Church in 1791. Acrelius served simultaneously as both pastor and provost to the Swedish congregations in the area.  He was a minister at St. Paul's Church in Chester, Pennsylvania in 1756.

He learned English and provided aid to German Lutherans in Pennsylvania. He also made notable zoological, botanical, and geological collections.

Because of health concerns, Acrelius returned to Sweden in 1756. The king gave him a large pension, and he received the lucrative pastorate of a church in the parish of Fellingsbro in the  province of Västmanland during 1758.  Shortly thereafter in 1759, he published his History of New Sweden, which dealt with the religious and secular history of the area.  This book was translated into English by William Morton Reynolds, who learnt Swedish for the purpose, and published in 1874.

Notes

References
 Who Was Who in America, Historical Volume, 1607-1896. (Chicago: Marquis Who's Who, 1963)
 Holy Trinity (Old Swedes') Church (The Swedish Colonial Society. Wilmington, Del.)
 Burr, Horace  The Records of Holy Trinity (Old Swedes) Church, Wilmington, Del., from 1697 to 1773 Holy Trinity Church. Wilmington, Del. Published by Historical Society of Delaware, 1890)
 Wallington, Nellie Urner Historic Churches of America (New York: Duffield & Co., 1907)
 
 Israel Acrelius, A History of New Sweden; or, the Settlements on the Delaware River, translated by William M. Reynolds (Philadelphia: Memoirs of the Historical Society of Pennsylvania, vol. 11, 1874)

People from Österåker Municipality
18th-century American Lutheran clergy
18th-century Swedish Lutheran priests
Swedish Lutheran missionaries
Lutheran missionaries in the United States
Uppsala University alumni
People from Wilmington, Delaware
Lutheranism in Delaware
1714 births
1800 deaths
Religious leaders from Delaware
Church of Sweden clergymen in Colonial North America